Qaraağac (also, Karaagach, Karagach, Kara-Ogatch, and Yakha-Kara-Agach) is a village and municipality in the Sabirabad Rayon of Azerbaijan.  It has a population of 2,080.

References 

Populated places in Sabirabad District